Lewis Henry Elverson (November 13, 1912 – May 1, 1997) was an American college football player and coach, track and field coach, and college athletics administrator. He played college football at the University of Pennsylvania from 1934 to 1936 and was the head football coach at Swarthmore College for 32 seasons over three stints, starting in 1938 and ending in 1974.

Early years
Elverson attended Toms River High School in Toms River, New Jersey, where he competed for the baseball, basketball, football, and track teams. He also attended the Hun School of Princeton where competed for the football and rowing teams.

Elverson moved on to the University of Pennsylvania, where he played college football at the quarterback and halfback positions for the Penn Quakers from 1934 to 1936 and was captain of the 1936 team that compiled a 7–1 record and was ranked No. 10 in the final AP Poll. He was a member of Penn's "Destiny Backfield" during those years.

Coaching career
Elverson was hired as the freshman football coach at Swarthmore College in August 1937. In May 1938, he was promoted to head football coach at Swarthmore. In 1939, he led Swarthmore to the first undefeated season in school history. 

His career at Swarthmore was interrupted by service as a lieutenant commander in the United States Navy during World War II from 1942 to 1945. During the war, he coached the Atlantic City Naval Air Station football team in 1943 and 1944.

Elverson returned to Swarthmore after the war and served as the school's head football coach for a total of 32 seasons, ending with the 1972 and 1974 seasons. He compiled a record of 96–130–7 as Swarthmore's head football coach.

Elverson served as the coach of Swarthmore's track team from 1951 to 1978 and for several years as the school's athletic director. He was also a professor of physical education at the college.

Later years
Elverson died from congestive heart failure, on May 1, 1997, at Lankenau Hospital in Wynnewood, Pennsylvania.

Head coaching record

Football

Notes

References

External links
 

1912 births
1997 deaths
American football halfbacks
American football quarterbacks
Penn Quakers football players
Swarthmore Garnet Tide athletic directors
Swarthmore Garnet Tide football coaches
College track and field coaches in the United States
Swarthmore College faculty
Hun School of Princeton alumni
Toms River High School South alumni
United States Navy officers
United States Navy personnel of World War II
Players of American football from Philadelphia
Sportspeople from Toms River, New Jersey
Coaches of American football from New Jersey
Players of American football from New Jersey
Military personnel from New Jersey